Shraga Har-Gil (Hebrew שרגא הר-גיל), (born Paul-Philipp Freudenberger; 19 September 1926, in Würzburg – 20 September 2009, in Würzburg) was a German-Israeli journalist, Middle East correspondent and a writer. He Hebraized his name to Har-Gil (Mount of Joy) in 1949.

Life 
Har-Gil was the second son of a real estate agent whose family lived in Germany for centuries. His mother was an Orthodox Jew, his father a Social Democrat. In 1935 the whole family fled the Gestapo and escaped to Mandatory Palestine. During the Second World-War he fought in the Jewish Brigade of the British Army and at the end of the War he fought for the Independence of Israel. He was severely wounded and was permanently handicapped, however this did not hinder him in attaining prominence in his literary career both as a journalist and an author of short stories.

He was the chief correspondent in the then biggest Israeli newspaper Maariv for twenty years and subsequently became Middle East correspondent for German, Austrian and a Luxemburg newspapers. Time and again he focused upon the problem of the Middle East conflict and the difficult way towards peace. "There is no peace because there is no confidence". He never stopped advocating  for dialogue even with the Hamas: "You have to negotiate with enemies not with friends."

In his next career he set out to establish himself as a literary writer with an emphasis on Judaica and Israel. In this capacity he made many lecture tours throughout Germany. He was invited repeatedly to lecture in Germany at the Jewish Culture-Festival in the Rhineland.

In 2009 Har-Gil was nominated for the Würzburg Peace Prize.  He should be honored, because he, whose whole life first in Germany, then in Mandatory Palestine and Israel, was imprinted with the effects of anti-Semitism, hatred and wars, in spite of all he said: "I don't hate!" and he continued: "War is no solution, never!"

From 1999 Har-Gil and his German life partner Ulla Gessner, who became his co-author, lived together in Tel Aviv.

Books (selection) 

 Auserwählt und trotzdem heiter. Witze aus Israel, 1970 (hg. mit Uri Sela)
 Alte Liebe rostet nie, Erzählungen aus Würzburg als die Nazizeit begann, 2004 (Vorwort H. Steidle)
 Der schöne Busen der Nachbarin. Geschichten aus 50 Jahren Israel, 2006 (Vorwort P. Pagel)
 Täubele, mein geliebtes Täubele. Jüdische Geschichten, 2008
 Ein Witz geht um die Welt, in: Jüdischer Almanach "Humor" 2004 (Hg. Gisela Dachs)
 Onkel Schlomo – ein ungewöhnlicher Jecke, ebd. "Die Jeckes" 2005

Movie 

 Die Kunst des Überlebens. Documentation about Har-Gil's life and love from Amir Har-Gil (son), 52 min. Israel 2003, Germany WDR 3 (Red. Felix Kuballa) 9. July 2004 (first broadcast)

External links 
 Radio broadcast from WDR, 10 September 2006 "The Jewish child in Würzburg"
 
  Obituary.
 Obituary, The Foreign Press Association in Israel

References 

Jewish emigrants from Nazi Germany to Mandatory Palestine
Writers from Würzburg
1926 births
2009 deaths
Israeli journalists
Mandatory Palestine military personnel of World War II
Jewish Brigade personnel
20th-century journalists